Rocky is the second video game based on the popular series of Rocky franchise, developed and published by Sega and released for the Master System in 1987. The player must train Rocky Balboa before each fight to improve his skills. Rocky possesses a straight punch, a hook, an uppercut, and body punch as well as various combos.

Plot
The opponents, in order, are: Apollo Creed, Clubber Lang, and Ivan Drago.

Fights are of 15 rounds duration, with an increasing level of difficulty depending on the opponent, and different strategies required to overcome each.

The game also features a two-player mode where player two can choose from any of the above opponents, while player one always controls Rocky.

Reception

Critical response
Computer Gaming World in 1988 stated that Rocky had "the most eye-popping graphics".

References

External links

Movie Game Database

1987 video games
Sega video games
Rocky (film series) video games
Master System games
Master System-only games
Video games developed in Japan